Kanak Saha is an Indian astrophysicist. He is an associate professor of astrophysics at Inter-University Centre for Astronomy and Astrophysics. His research interests include formation of galaxies in the early universe and their evolution. The Council of Scientific and Industrial Research, the apex agency of the Government of India for scientific research, awarded him the Shanti Swarup Bhatnagar Prize for Science and Technology for his contributions to physical sciences in 2021.

Early life and education 
Kanak Saha was born on 4 February 1977 in Cooch Behar, West Bengal. Saha graduated from Scottish Church College in 1998 with B.Sc. in physics. He did his M.Sc. from Banaras Hindu University in 2001. He earned his Ph.D. in 2008 from Indian Institute of Science.

Awards 
In 2021, Saha was awarded the Shanti Swarup Bhatnagar Prize for Science and Technology in the physical sciences category for his breakthrough discovery of a faint galaxy at high redshift using Astrosat.

References

Living people
Indian physicists
Indian astrophysicists
Academic staff of Savitribai Phule Pune University
21st-century Indian physicists
Banaras Hindu University alumni
Scottish Church College alumni
Indian Institute of Science alumni
Year of birth missing (living people)
Scientists from Kolkata